Aleksandar Filipović may refer to:

 Aleksandar Filipović (rower) (born 1992), Serbian rower
 Aleksandar Filipović (footballer) (born 1994), Serbian professional footballer